Mount Grafton is the high point of the southern section of the Schell Creek Range in southern White Pine County, in eastern Nevada in the western United States.

References

External links 
 
 

Mountains of Nevada
Mountains of White Pine County, Nevada